The SVC Mačka (—"cat") was a single-seat acrobatic glider of wooden construction with undercarriage skis for landing. It was constructed and produced at Savezni Vazduhoplovni Centar (SVC) in Vršac. It was the only acrobatic glider constructed in Yugoslavia.

Development
The Mačka was developed by engineer Miloš Ilić. Its prototype was made in 1956, and after testing, a small series was produced in 1958, also in Vršac. Ilić has basically copied Mačka's tail and rear fuselage from another glider, the Ilindenka.

Production
Production aircraft and variants were built at SVC, LETOV (as the LETOV KBI-14 Mačka) and Ikarus (Ikarus Prva srpska industrija aeroplana, automobila i strojeva).

Specifications (variant specified)

References

1950s Yugoslav sailplanes